The 1988–89 season was Clydebank's twenty-third season in the Scottish Football League. They competed in the Scottish First Division and finished 3rd. They also competed in the Scottish League Cup and Scottish Cup.

Results

Division 1

Final League table

Scottish League Cup

Scottish Cup

References

 

Clydebank
Clydebank F.C. (1965) seasons